La Iglesia Pentecostal La Luz del Mundo / Light of the World Church Pentecostal Church is an Assemblies of God Pentecostal church in Williamsburg, Brooklyn, New York City, located at 179 South 9th Street, occupying the historic 19th-century former New England Congregational Church since 1955.

The former New England Congregational Church was a Congregational Church built between 1852 and 1853 in the Italianate-style to designs by Thomas Little.  It is a brick building faced in brownstone with wood and metal trim.  Henry Ward Beecher gave the keynote address at the cornerstone laying and his younger brother Thomas K. Beecher was the guiding spirit for the young congregation.  The adjacent rectory was built in 1868.

At some point, the Congregational congregation sold the church and it was operating as a Lutheran church in the mid 20th century. The Lutherans sold the church in 1955 to Iglesia Pentecostal La Luz del Mundo / Light of the World Church Pentecostal Church (Assemblies of God Pentecostal). It was landmark protected in 1981. It was restored between 1988 and 1993, and as of 2008 was still in use. It was listed on the National Register of Historic Places in 1983.

See also  
 List of New York City Landmarks
 National Register of Historic Places listings in Kings County, New York

References 

Light of the World Church Pentecostal Church (New York City)
Light of the World Church Pentecostal Church (New York City)
Churches in Brooklyn
Churches completed in 1853
19th-century churches in the United States
Hispanic and Latino American culture in New York City
Light of the World Church Pentecostal Church (New York City)
Light of the World Church Pentecostal Church (New York City)
Light of the World Church Pentecostal Church (New York City)
New York City Designated Landmarks in Brooklyn
Properties of religious function on the National Register of Historic Places in Brooklyn
Williamsburg, Brooklyn
Italianate church buildings in the United States
1853 establishments in New York (state)